The following is a list of Malayalam films released in the year 1987.

Dubbed films

References

 1987
1987
Lists of 1987 films by country or language
Fil